This is a list of notable footballers who have played for FC Nantes. Generally, this means those who appeared in 100 or more first-class (league, Coupe de France, Coupe de la Ligue and European) matches for the club. However, some players who have played fewer matches are also included, if they fell short of the total of 100 appearances but made significant contributions to the history of the club. For a full list of all Nantes players with Wikipedia articles, see :Category:FC Nantes players.

Players are listed according to the date of their first professional contract signed with the club. Appearances and goals are for competitive first-team matches only. Substitute appearances included. Players whose nationality contains a link (in blue) to their country won full international caps, whilst at Nantes or elsewhere.

List of players 
As of 1 September 2017

References

Nantes
 
Association football player non-biographical articles